Chetan Singh Hari (born 14 September 1936) is an Indian former cyclist. He competed in the team time trial and the team pursuit events at the 1964 Summer Olympics.

References

External links
 

1936 births
Living people
Indian male cyclists
Olympic cyclists of India
Cyclists at the 1964 Summer Olympics
Place of birth missing (living people)